Nicolas Campion (born 15 January 1983 in Paris) is a French former professional footballer who played as a midfielder.

He played on the professional level in Ligue 2 for Troyes AC.

External links
 

Living people
1983 births
French footballers
Footballers from Paris
Association football midfielders
Ligue 2 players
Championnat National players
Championnat National 2 players
ES Troyes AC players
CO Châlons players
US Roye-Noyon players
US Chantilly players
Villemomble Sports players